Zahira Zahir is a Washington barber and cosmetologist.
Zahira's salon is in the Watergate hotel.  She is known for cutting the hair of
United States President George W. Bush.  The President's nickname for her is Z.

Early life
Zahira is the daughter of
Abdul Zahir, who was the Prime Minister of Afghanistan from 1971 to 1972. An ethnic Pashtun, she is also the older sister of Ahmad Zahir, called the "Afghan Elvis". Zahira is a graduate of, and later a teacher at, Zarghuna High School, reported to have been the leading school for girls in Kabul.

Life in the United States
Zahira moved to the United States in 1975, when her husband was Afghanistan's envoy to the United Nations.

After the Communist coup in 1978 her brother was murdered, her father put under house arrest, and all her family's assets were seized.

Around the time of the Communist coup in Afghanistan she and her husband separated.

Zahira described working for Milton Pitts, President Ronald Reagan's barber, accompanying him to the White House to give the President a manicure while he got his hair cut, and being asked whether Reagan should authorize giving the Afghan resistance stinger missiles.

Zahira also started cutting George H. W. Bush's hair, as well as Barbara Bush, Reagan, Margaret Thatcher and other dignitaries.  She described feeling hurt by the number of customers she lost following al Qaeda's attacks on September 11, 2001, and being brought to tears by George H.W. Bush's thoughtfulness.  He contacted her personally, following the attacks, telling her:

When he learned of the prejudice she was experiencing he sent her an autographed photo, and organized autographed photos from several other Presidents who knew her.

Legacy

In 2003, Zahira raised funds to restore schools for girls in Kabul.

References

External links
www.zahiraschools.org

Pashtun women
Year of birth missing (living people)
Living people
Afghan emigrants to the United States
People from Washington, D.C.
Barbers